Legmen is an American drama television series that aired on NBC on Friday nights from January 20 to March 16, 1984.

Premise
Jack Gage and David Taylor were two college students in southern California, who to make extra money did the legwork for private eye Oscar Armismendi, and in later episodes Tom Bannon.

Cast
Bruce Greenwood as Jack Gage
John Terlesky as David Taylor
Don Calfa as Oscar Armismendi
Claude Akins as Tom Bannon

Episodes

US television ratings

References

External links

NBC original programming
1980s American drama television series
1984 American television series debuts
1984 American television series endings
Television shows set in California
American action television series
English-language television shows
Television series by Universal Television